Satay (in USA also), or sate in Indonesian spelling, is a Southeast Asian dish of seasoned, skewered and grilled meat, served with a sauce. The earliest preparations of satay is believed to have originated in Java island, but has spread to almost anywhere in Indonesia, where it has become a national dish. Indonesian satay is often served with peanut sauce  – a sauce made from peanut butter, and is often accompanied with lontong, a type of rice cake, though the diversity of the country has produced a wide variety of satay recipes. It is also popular in many other Southeast Asian countries including Brunei, Malaysia, Philippines, Singapore and Thailand. It is also recognized and popular in Suriname and the Netherlands.
 In Sri Lanka, it has become a staple of the local diet as a result of the influences from the local Malay community.

Satay may consist of diced or sliced chicken, goat, mutton, beef, pork, fish, other meats, or tofu; bamboo skewers are often used, while rustic style of preparations employ skewers from the midrib of the coconut palm frond. These are grilled or barbecued over a wood or charcoal fire, then served with various spicy seasonings. Satay can be served in various sauces; however, most often they are served in a combination of soy and peanut sauce. Hence, peanut sauce is often called satay sauce. It is popular as street food, and it can be obtained from a travelling satay vendor, from a street-side tent-restaurant, in an upper-class restaurant, or at traditional celebration feasts.

Close analogues are yakitori from Japan, kǎoròu chuàn from China, seekh kebab from the Indian Subcontinent, shish kebab from Turkey and the Middle East, shashlik from Eastern Europe and the Caucasus, and sosatie from South Africa. It is listed at number 14 on World's 50 most delicious foods readers' poll compiled by CNN Go in 2011.

Origin and history

The term is mentioned as saté in Dutch with one of earliest photographs of satay seller appeared circa 1870 in Java, Dutch East Indies. Satay may have been developed by Javanese street vendors as an adaptation of kebabs from the Indian Subcontinent. The Indonesian publication Koran Jakarta claimed that sate, and ultimately satay, originated from Javanese term sak beteng which means one stick, and that the dish had existed as early as the 15th century.

From Java, satay spread through the Indonesian Archipelago and, as a consequence, numerous variations of the dish have been developed. By the late-19th century, satay had crossed the Strait of Malacca into neighbouring Malaysia, Singapore, and Thailand. The Indo Dutch people took this dish, as well as many other Indonesian specialties, to the Netherlands, thereby influencing Dutch cuisine.

Preparation
 
Satay can be made from various meats. Meat commonly used includes chicken, lamb, goat, mutton, beef, venison, and rabbit; seafood such as fish, shrimp, and squid; or offal such as liver, intestine, and tripe. Some have also used more exotic varieties of meat, such as turtle, crocodile, horse, lizard, and snake meat. Chicken is most common, but the other meats are frequently used. Satay is made by cutting the meat into small cube shapes, about thumb-size. However, such recipes as Ponorogo use chicken fillet cut into an elongated finger-like shape, thus one skewer holds only one piece. Yogyakarta has a special goat satay called Sate Klatak the difference between other satays is using iron bars for the stick. 

The skewers used for chicken satay are traditionally made from lidi, a midrib of coconut fronds. Bamboo skewers might be used instead. For firmer meats, such as lamb, goat, and beef, a thicker bamboo skewer is used. The skewers are usually soaked in water before using to avoid burning during grilling. Each skewer usually holds four pieces of meat, some only three pieces. A goat meat satay might insert a cube of fat between meat cubes. Turmeric is required to marinate satay to give the dish its characteristic yellow colour. Another popular marinade is sweet soy sauce mixed with coconut oil or palm margarine. The skewered meat is seasoned, marinated, and then grilled on charcoal embers.

Satay may be served with a spicy peanut sauce dip, or peanut gravy, served with slices of lontong or ketupat (rice cakes), garnished with a sprinkle of bawang goreng (crisp fried shallot), and accompanied by acar (pickles) consisting of slivers of onions, carrots, and cucumbers in vinegar, salt, and sugar solution. Mutton satay is usually served with kecap manis (sweet soy sauce) instead of peanut sauce. Pork satay can be served in a pineapple-based satay sauce or cucumber relish.

Availability and outlets of note

Satay can be prepared home-made or acquired from satay sellers; either from fancy restaurants, modest tarp-tent warung eateries stationed on busy street side, to travelling food vendors frequenting residential areas. Indeed, satay is possibly one of the most popular street food in Southeast Asia; common in Indonesia to Malaysia and Thailand.

In Indonesia, traditionally there are several methods on selling satay. They are:
Pikulan: In Indonesian, pikulan means carrying items by balancing a rod on one's shoulder. The most traditional way of selling satay appear in early photographs of Java in late 19th century shows the travelling satay vendor using this pikulan which resembles two small wooden cabinets carried with a rod made of either bamboo, wood or rattan. 
Sunggi: In Javanese, sunggi means carrying things upon one's head using some kind of tray or platter. This practice is quite common in today's Bali and rural Java. The sunggi satay vendors — usually women — carry raw satays, lontongs, peanut sauce upon the wooden or wicker bamboo tray on their head, while carrying basket containing grill, charcoal, bamboo fan, sweet soy sauce bottle, and wooden small short chair called dingklik. The satay seller ladies may walk through residential areas or position their wares in busy areas (e.g. marketplace or tourism area), and grill the satay to their customer's order.
Gerobak: In Indonesian, gerobak means wheeled cart. It is one of the common method of selling satay by travelling vendors. The Madura satay vendor cart usually has unique boat-like shape gerobak food cart.
Warung: In Indonesian, warung means modest shop, selling foods or other things. The most common satay warung usually are warung tenda, modest tarp-tent shop stationed in busy street side to await customers.
Online satay: In recent years with the advent of digital multi-service method that includes food delivery such as GoFood and GrabFood, satay is available by ordering online, and the food immediately delivered by motorcycle taxi called ojek.

In Indonesia there are some restaurants that specialised on serving various kinds of satay and present it as their speciality, such as Sate Ponorogo Restaurant, Sate Blora Restaurant, and also chains of Sate Khas Senayan restaurants, previously known as Satay House Senayan.

Variants

Indonesia 

Satay (known as sate in Indonesian and pronounced similar to the English "satay") is a widely renowned dish in almost all regions of Indonesia; it is considered the national dish and one of Indonesia's best dishes. Satay is a staple in Indonesian cuisine, served everywhere from street carts to fine dining establishments, as well as in homes and at public gatherings. As a result, many variations have been developed throughout the Indonesian Archipelago. The satay variants in Indonesia is usually named after the region its originated, the meats, parts or ingredients its uses, also might named after the process or method of cooking.

Chicken
 Sate Ambal A satay variant from Ambal, Kebumen, Central Java. This satay uses a native breed of poultry, ayam kampung. The sauce is not based on peanuts, but rather ground tempe, chilli and spices. The chicken meat is marinated for about two hours to make the meat tastier. This satay is accompanied with ketupat.
 Sate Ayam Chicken satay, the most common and widely distributed type of satay in Indonesia.
 Sate Banjar A variant of chicken satay popular in Southern Kalimantan, especially in the town of Banjarmasin.
 Sate Blora A variant originating in Blora, in Central Java. This variant is made of chicken (meat and skin) pieces that are smaller compared to the other variants. It is normally eaten with peanut sauce, rice, and a traditional soup made of coconut milk and herbs. Sate Blora is grilled in front of buyers as they are eating. The buyers tell the vendor to stop grilling when they are sated.
 Sate Kulit Skin Satay. Found in Sumatra, this is a crisp satay made from marinated chicken skin.

 Sate Madura (Madura satay) Originating on the island of Madura, near Java, it is a famous satay variant among Indonesians. Most often made from mutton or chicken, the recipe's main characteristic is the black sauce made from Indonesian sweet soy sauce/kecap manis mixed with palm sugar (called gula jawa or "Javanese sugar" in Indonesia), garlic, deep fried shallots, peanut paste, petis (a kind of shrimp paste), kemiri (candlenut), and salt. Chicken Madura satay is usually served in peanut sauce, while the mutton Madura satay is usually served in sweet soy sauce. Sate Madura uses thinner chunks of meat than other variants. It is eaten with rice or rice cakes wrapped in banana/coconut leaves (lontong/ketupat), they are usually sliced into smaller pieces before being served. Raw thinly sliced shallots and plain sambal are often served as condiments.
 Sate Ponorogo (Ponorogo satay) A variant of satay originating in Ponorogo, a town in East Java. It is made from sliced marinated chicken meat, and served with a sauce made of peanuts and chili sauce and garnished with shredded shallots, sambal (chili paste) and lime juice. The meat is marinated in spices and sweet soy sauce, in a process called bacem and is served with rice or lontong (rice cake). The grill is made from terracotta earthenware with a hole in one side to allow ventilation for the coals. After three months of use, the earthenware grill disintegrates, and must be replaced.
 Sate Taichan A spicy chicken satay in hot sambal sauce, served with lontong, popular in Jakarta. It was said that the dish was an adaptation of skewered Chinese snack from Taiwan, which originally uses pork or rabbit meat, and served with soy sauce. The Indonesian version maintain the light Chinese-style seasoning, replaces pork with chicken, and adds spiciness with the addition of hot sambal. Another source mentioned that sate Taichan was devised from a Japanese man's specific request that his satay omits peanut sauce and sweet soy sauce, and only seasoned with a dash of salt and lime juice, and served with chili paste.

Beef

 Sate Bumbon A spiced beef satay from Kendal, Central Java.
 Sate Buntel Lit: Wrapped Satay, a speciality from Solo or Surakarta, Central Java. It is made from minced beef, goat, lamb and mutton (especially meats around ribs and belly area). The minced fatty meats are wrapped by thin fat or muscle membrane and wrapped around a bamboo skewer. The size of this satay is quite large, very similar to a Middle Eastern kebab. After being grilled on charcoal, the meat is separated from the skewer, cut into bite-size chunks, then served in sweet soy sauce and merica (pepper).
 Sate Gajih Beef fat satay popular in Yogyakarta, especially in Beringharjo Market. The fat satay is seasoned with sweet soy sauce and considered as snack since it is commonly served without any rice or additional sauces.
 Sate Kuah Lit: Soupy Satay, beef satay served in creamy and spicy kuah soup akin to soto. Sate kuah can be found in Betawi cuisine of Jakarta and also in Pontianak, Western Kalimantan. The Jakarta version sate kuah soup base is akin to Betawi's soto tangkar, since sate kuah was a variant of soto tangkar created in 1960s. Thus usually the seller offers both sate kuah and soto tangkar. The serving method are either grilled beef satay are dipped into soto soup, or the satay meat are stripped from the skewers and put into the soto soup. Compared to soto meat soup, sate kuah has smoky aroma due to grilling process. 
 Sate Lembut A rare satay recipe of the Betawi people. It is can be found in Jalan Kebon Kacang, Central Jakarta. The satay is made from minced beef mixed with shredded coconut and spices, wrapped around a flat bamboo skewer. Usually eaten with ketupat laksa betawi (Betawi style Laksa with ketupat glutinous compressed rice).
 Sate Manis Also a speciality from the Betawi people. It is also can be found in Jalan Kebon Kacang, Central Jakarta. The satay is made from slices of has dalam (tenderloin) the finest part of beef, marinated with sweet spices. Usually eaten with ketupat laksa betawi.

 Sate Maranggi Commonly found in Purwakarta and Cianjur, the cities in West Java, this satay is made from beef marinated in a special paste. The two most important elements of the paste are kecombrang (Nicolaia speciosa) flower buds and ketan (sweet rice) flour. Nicola buds bring a unique aroma and a liquorice-like taste. The satay is served in sweet soy sauce with acar pickles. It is served with ketan cake (jadah) or plain rice.
 Sate Matang A satay variant from Matang Geulumpang Dua, Bireun, Aceh. This satay is made from beef, usually served with peanut sauce and soto or soup separately.
 Sate Sapi Beef satay, served in sweet soy sauce and peanut sauce. Specialty of Jepara town in Central Java.
 Sate Susu Literally it means "milky satay", however it contains no milk, the term susu is actually refer to cow's breast or udder. This dish that can be found in Java and Bali, is made from grilled spicy beef udder, served with hot chilli sauce.
 Sate Tambulinas Spiced beef satay from Sulawesi. Tambulinas satay do not use peanut sauce or soy sauce, it is marinated in spice mixture containing ground chilli pepper, ginger, lemongrass, shallot and garlic, and served with juice of kaffir lime.

Other red meats

 Sate kambing Goat satay, a variant of satay popular in Java, made with goat, lamb or mutton meat. Different from other satays, sate kambing (lamb satay) is not usually pre-seasoned or pre-cooked. Raw lamb, mutton, and goat is skewered and grilled directly on the charcoal. It is then served with sweet soy sauce (kecap manis), sliced shallots, and cut-up tomatoes. Since the meat is not pre-cooked, it is important to use young lamb. The best vendors use lamb under three to five months old. Lamb from goat is also more popular than lamb from sheep due to milder flavor.
 Sate kerbau Water buffalo satay, a variant of satay popular in Kudus, where most Muslim believed that it is forbidden to eat beef to respect the Hindus. This satay is made with water buffalo meat. The meat is cooked first with palm sugar, coriander, cumin, and other seasoning until very tender. Some vendor choose to even grind the meat first to make it really tender. It is then grilled on charcoal, and served with sauce made with coconut milk, palm sugar, and other seasoning. Traditionally, satay kerbau is served on a plate covered with teak wood leaves.
 Sate kronyos Breast of goat satay can be found in Bantul Regency, Yogyakarta.
 Sate loso Water buffalo meat or sometimes replaced with beef satay, served in spicy chili peanut sauce. Specialty of Pemalang, Central Java. 
 Sate rusa Deer satay, a delicacy from Merauke, Papua.
 Sate tegal (tegal satay) A sate of a yearling or five-month-old lamb; the nickname for this dish in Tegal is balibul, an acronym of baru lima bulan (just five months). Each kodi, or dish, contains twenty skewers, and each skewer has four chunks — two pieces of meat, one piece of fat and then another piece of meat. It is grilled over wood charcoal until it is cooked between medium and well done; however it is possible to ask for medium rare. Sometimes the fat piece can be replaced with liver or heart or kidney. This is not marinated prior to grilling. On serving, it is accompanied by sweet soya sauce (medium sweetness, slightly thinned with boiled water), sliced fresh chilli, sliced raw shallots (eschalot), quartered green tomatoes, and steamed rice, and is sometimes garnished with fried shallots.

Pork

 Sate babi (pork satay) Pork satay, popular among the Indonesian Chinese community, most of whom do not share the Muslim prohibition against pork. This dish can be found in Chinatowns in Indonesian cities, especially around Glodok, Pecenongan, and Senen in the Jakarta area. It is also popular in Bali where the majority are Hindus, it is also popular in Northern Sulawesi, Northern Tapanuli, and Nias, where most people are Christians, and also popular in the Netherlands.
 Sate plecing Satay made with variety of grilled meat most often pork, served with sambal plecing, sauce made from chili, garlic, onion, tomatoes, and shrimp paste, popular in Balinese cuisine.

Fish and seafood
 Sate Bandeng Milkfish Satay, from Banten. It is a satay made from boneless bandeng (milkfish). The seasoned spicy milkfish meat is separated from the small bones, then placed back into the milkfish skin, clipped by a bamboo stick, and grilled over charcoal.
 Sate Belut Eel Satay, another Lombok rare delicacy. It is made from belut, (lit. eel) commonly found in watery rice paddies in Indonesia. A seasoned eel is skewered and wrapped around each skewer, then grilled over charcoal fire, so each skewer contains an individual small eel.
 Sate Gurita Octopus satay, a specialty dish from Sabang.
 Sate Kerang Shellfish Satay. The most popular variant of sate kerang is from Medan, North Sumatra, it is rich spicy cooked shellfish in skewer and often become oleh-oleh (souvenir) for visitors visiting Medan. In Java, sate kerang it is mildly marinated and boiled, also served as a side-dish to accompany soto.
 Sate Tuna Tuna Satay, a specialty satay from Gorontalo.

 Sate Udang Shrimp Satay that uses large shrimps or prawns, shelled and cleaned and often with the tails off and lightly grilled. Some recipes call for a marinade of thick coconut milk with sambal (chili paste), powdered laos (galangal root), ground kemiri (candlenut, one can substitute macadamia nuts in a pinch), minced shallots and pressed garlic. One can add salt to taste. Shrimp satay seldom served with the peanut sauce so popular with other satays, because it might overpower a delicate shrimp flavour.

Offals
 Sate Ampet Another Lombok delicacy. It is made from beef, cow's intestines and other cow's internal organs. The sauce for sate ampet is hot and spicy, which is no surprise since the island's name, lombok merah, means red chili. The sauce is santan (coconut milk) and spices.
 Sate Babat Tripe satay. Mildly marinated and mostly boiled than grilled, usually served as a side-dish to accompany soto.
 Sate Burung Ayam-ayamanBird Satay, the satay is made from gizzard, liver, and intestines of burung ayam-ayaman (watercock). After being seasoned with mild spices and stuck on a skewer, this bird's internal organs aren't grilled, but are deep fried in cooking oil instead.
 Sate HatiLiver Satay. There is two types of liver satays, cattle liver (goat or cow) and chicken liver satay. The cattle liver made by diced whole liver, while the chicken liver satay is made from mixture of chicken liver, gizzard, and intestines. Usually gizzard is placed on the bottom, intestine on the center and liver or heart on the top. After seasoning, the internal organs are not fried or grilled, but are boiled instead. It's not treated as a main dish, but often as a side dish to accompany bubur ayam (chicken rice porridge).
 Sate Jando A specialty dish from Bandung, this satay is made from cow's nipple fat.
 Sate Kikil Cow skin satay from Java, this satay is made from boiled cow skin, skewered and seasoned either in spicy peanut sauce or yellow sauce.
 Sate Makassar From a region in Southern Sulawesi, this satay is made from beef and cow offal marinated in sour carambola sauce. It has a unique sour and spicy taste. Unlike most satays, it is served without sauce.

 Sate Padang A dish from Padang and the surrounding area in Western Sumatra, which is made from cow or goat offal and meat boiled in spicy broth then grilled. Its main characteristic is a yellow sauce made from rice flour mixed with spicy offal broth, turmeric, ginger, garlic, coriander, galangal root, cumin, curry powder and salt. It is further separated into two sub-variants, the Pariaman and the Padang Panjang, which differ in taste and the composition of their yellow sauces.
 Sate Torpedo Testicles satay. Satay made from goat testicles marinated in soy sauce and grilled. It is eaten with peanut sauce, pickles, and hot white rice.
 Sate Usus Chicken intestine satay. This mildly marinated satay is usually fried, also as a side-dish to accompany bubur ayam.

Mixture

 Sate Kalong  A satay dish from Cirebon. The word kalong (bat) doesn't mean the satay used bat meat but because the food is sold in the evening. This satay is made from minced water buffalo, which is mixed with spices, and palm sugar and dipped into buffalo broth, it is then grilled on charcoal. The peanut sauce mixed with oncom.
 Sate Lilit  A satay variant from Balinese cuisine. This satay is made from minced pork, chicken, fish, beef,  or even turtle meat, which is then mixed with grated coconut, thick coconut milk, lemon juice, shallots, and pepper. Wound around bamboo, sugar cane or lemon grass sticks, it is then grilled on charcoal.
 Sate Pusut A delicacy from Lombok, the neighbouring island east of Bali. It is made from a mixture of minced meat (beef, chicken, or fish), shredded coconut meat, and spices. The mixture then is wrapped around a skewer and grilled over charcoal.

Eggs and vegetarian
 Sate Aci The satay is made from tapioca starch batter.
 Sate Jamur Mushroom satay. It is usually made from oyster mushroom.
 Sate Kere Lit: Poorman's satay. A cheap vegetarian satay made from grounded tempe from Solo city, served in peanut sauce and pickles. There are two kinds of tempe: the most popular is made from soybean, and the second is made from the side product material of tofu production (called tempe gembus). Sate Kere is usually made from tempe gembus. The word kere in the Javanese language means "poor"; it originally was meant to provide the poor people of Java with the taste of satay at an affordable price, since meat was considered a luxury. Although originally it was only vegetarian tempeh, today, sate kere also includes intestine, liver, and beef satays mixed with tempeh ones. The materials are pre-cooked in baceman before being grilled, then served with peanut sauce.

 Sate Telur Muda Young egg satay. This satay is made from premature chicken egg (uritan) obtained upon slaughtering the hens. The immature eggs that have not developed the eggshell yet are boiled and put onto skewers to be grilled as satay. The telur muda or uritan is often cooked on the same skewer as chicken skin satay, and mixed with chicken satay. This kind of satay is also usually served as a side dish to accompany bubur ayam.
 Sate Telur Puyuh Quail eggs satay. Several hard-boiled quail eggs are put into skewers, marinated in sweet soy sauce with spices, and boiled further also served as a side dish for soto.

Others
 Sate Bebek Duck satay, a specialty dish from Cilegon, Banten and Banyumas.
 Sate Blengong The satay is made from Blengong meat, an animal that is the result of crossbreeding between ducks and muscovy ducks or locals called menthok. It is a delicacy of Brebes.
 Sate Bulus Turtle satay, another rare delicacy from Yogyakarta. It is a satay made from freshwater bulus (softshell turtle). It is served with sliced fresh shallots (small red onion), pepper, and sweet soy sauce. Bulus meat is also served in soup or tongseng (Javanese style spicy-sweet soup).
 Sate Kelinci Rabbit meat Satay, this variant of satay is made from rabbit meat, a delicacy from Java. It is served with sliced fresh shallots (small red onion), peanut sauce, and sweet soy sauce. Rabbit satay usually can be found in mountainous tourist region in Java where locals breed rabbit for its meat, such as Lembang in West Java, Kaliurang in Yogyakarta, Bandungan and Tawangmangu resort in Central Java, also Telaga Sarangan in East Java.

 Sate Keong Freshwater snail Satay. This kind of satay is also served as a side dish of pecel. In Minahasan cuisine, sate keong is grilled and smeared with spicy sambal and it is called sate kolombi. 
 Sate Kuda Horse meat Satay. Locally known in Javanese as sate jaran, this is made from horse meat, a delicacy from Yogyakarta. It is served with sliced fresh shallots (small red onion), pepper, and sweet soy sauce.
 Sate Ular Snake Satay, a rare and exotic delicacy usually founds in foodstalls specialise on serving exotic reptile meats like snakes and biawak (monitor lizards), such as the one founds near Gubeng train station in Surabaya, or near Mangga Besar and Tebet train station in Jakarta. It usually uses ular sendok (cobra) or sanca (python) meat. It is served with sliced fresh shallots (small red onion), pickles, pepper, and sweet soy sauce.

Malaysia

Known as sate in Malay (and pronounced similarly to the English "satay"), it can be found throughout all the states of Malaysia in restaurants and on the street, with hawkers selling satay in food courts and Pasar malam. While the popular kinds of satay are usually beef and chicken satays, different regions of Malaysia have developed their own unique variations. Sate is often associated with Muslim Malays, but pork sate is also available at non-halal Chinese eating establishments.

There are a number of well-known satay outlets in Kajang, a city in Selangor closely associated with satays. Sate Kajang is a generic name for a style of sate where the meat chunks are bigger than normal, and the sweet peanut sauce served along with a portion of fried chilli paste. Given its popularity, sate Kajang is now found throughout Malaysia. Stalls and restaurants around Kajang offer not only the more traditional chicken or beef satay, but also more exotic meats such as venison, rabbit or fish, as well as gizzard, liver, and a number of other variations.

Another type of meat satay is the sate lok-lok from Penang and sate celup (dip satay) from Malacca. Both are Malaysian Chinese fusions of the hotpot and the Malay satay. Pieces of raw meat, tofu, century eggs, quail eggs, fish cake, offal or vegetables are skewered on bamboo sticks. These are cooked by being dipped in boiling water or stock. The satay is then eaten with a sweet, dark sauce, sometimes with chilli sauce as an accompaniment. If the satay is eaten with satay sauce, it is called sate lok-lok. If the satay is cooked with boiling satay peanut sauce, it is called sate celup. Both dishes are available from street vendors or in certain restaurants, and the majority are not halal. Customers use a common container containing boiling stock to personally cook their satay. Sauces are either served in common containers or individually. There are usually no tables near street vendors, and customers thus tend to gather around the food cart.

Satay gula apong is a chicken or buffalo meat satay. It is a satay made with rare nipah palm sugar called sarawak gula apong. This rare satay can only be found in Linggi, Negeri Sembilan in Malaysia. It is served with sliced fresh cucumber and peanut sauce.

Netherlands

Known as saté or sateh, it is fully adapted in Dutch everyday cuisine. Owed to their shared colonial history, satay is an Indonesian food that has become an integral part of Dutch cuisine. Pork and chicken satays are almost solely served with spicy peanut sauce and called een sateetje, and are readily available in snackbars and supermarkets. Versions with goat-meat (sateh kambing) and sweet soy sauce are available in Indonesian restaurants and take-aways. Pork or chicken satay in peanut sauce, with salad and French-fries, is popular in pubs or eetcafes. With Indonesian take-away meals like nasi goreng speciaal, the special part is often a couple of sate-sticks. Another favourite in Dutch snackbars is the satékroket, a croquette made with a peanut sauce and shredded meat ragout. In addition, 'saté' sauce has become one of the standard options as a condiment to accompany a portion of fries bought in a snackbar (besides mayonnaise, ketchup, spiced curry-ketchup or 'joppiesaus').

Philippines

Satay proper is known as satti in the Southern Philippines (Mindanao). It is common in the regions of Zamboanga, Sulu Archipelago and Tawi-Tawi, which acquired satay from its proximity to Malaysia. Satti usually only has three small strips of roasted meat on a stick. Satti is usually made from chicken or beef among Muslim Filipinos,  but it can also be made with pork or liver. It is particularly popular in Tausug cuisine and is commonly eaten as breakfast in restaurants which specialise in satti. It is typically served with ta'mu (pusô in other Philippine languages) and a bowlful of warm sauce.

In the majority of the Philippines, a similar (but native) dish to satay usually made with pork or chicken is referred to as inihaw or inasal, or by the generic English name "barbecue" (usually shortened to "BBQ"). It is usually served glazed in a sweet-soy sauce marinade reminiscent of yakitori. Despite the native origins of inasal and inihaw, the English association of "barbecue" is the source of names for other popular street foods that are also served skewered, such as banana cue ("banana" + "barbecue") and camote cue ("camote (sweet potato) + barbecue").

Offal-based versions of inihaw are also commonly sold in the Philippines as street food. The most popular are made from chicken or pork intestines known as isaw. Other variants use liver, tripe, lungs, chicken heads and feet, cubes of coagulated pork blood, and pork ears, among others.

Annatto seeds and banana ketchup-based sauces are also widely used which gives the meat a vibrant orange or red color.

Singapore

In Singapore, satay is sold by Chinese, Malay and Indian Muslim vendors. It is thought to have originated in Java and brought to Singapore by Muslim traders. Satay is one of the earliest foods that became ubiquitous in Singapore since the 1940s, and was considered a celebratory food. Previously sold on makeshift roadside stalls and pushcarts, concerns over public health and the rapid development of the city led to a major consolidation of satay stalls at Beach Road in the 1950s, which came to be collectively called the "Satay Club". They were moved to the Esplanade Park in the 1960s, where they grew to the point of being constantly listed in tourism guides.

Open only after dark with an open air or "al fresco" dining concept, the Satay Club defined how satay is served in Singapore since then, although they are also found across the island in most hawker stalls, modern food courts, and upscale restaurants at any time of the day. Moved several times around Esplanade Park due to development and land reclamation, the outlets finally left the area permanently to Clarke Quay in the late 1990s to make way for the building of the Esplanade - Theatres on the Bay.

Several competing satay hotspots have since emerged. While the name has been transferred to the Clarke Quay site, several stalls from the original Satay club have moved to Sembawang in the north of the city. The satay stalls at the Lau Pa Sat area are notable for its popularity. "Satay Street" in Boon Tat Street, introduced in 1996, centers around 10 hawkers who sell satay. Served only at night after 7pm when the street is closed to vehicular traffic and the stalls and tables occupy the street, it mimics the open-air dining style of previous establishments. It is said to evoke the nostalgic feeling of Singaporean street food culture from the 1950s and 1960s, and is considered to be the last Satay Club in Singapore. Other notable outlets include Satay by the Bay at the Gardens by the Bay tourist attraction. It is styled after the old Satay Club.

Peanut sauce is used in Singaporean satays, Malay satay is quite similar to Indonesian satay by using kecap manis (sweet soy sauce), while Chinese Hainan satay uses pineapple purée sauce and marinated in five-spice powder. The common types of satay sold in Singapore include Satay Ayam (chicken satay), Satay Lembu (beef satay), Satay Kambing (mutton satay), Satay Perut (beef intestine), and Satay Babat (beef tripe).

Singapore's national carrier, Singapore Airlines, also serves satay to its First and Business Class (previously known as Raffles Class) passengers as an appetiser.

Sri Lanka
Sathe as it is known in Sri Lanka is a Sri Lankan Malay dish that has become a staple of the country's diet. Sathe is served with peanut and chili sauce. It is sometimes called sate daging by the country's Malay community.

Thailand

Satay is a popular dish in Thailand; a key feature of Thai satay is the inclusion of pork as a meat option. Usually served with peanut sauce and achat, Thai satay have various recipes, beyond the popular versions of chicken, beef, and pork: a version made with mussels is called hoi malaeng phu, while vegetarian variants employ soy protein strips or tofu.

Satay can easily be found in virtually any Thai restaurant worldwide. Because Thai cuisine is heavily marketed internationally and attracted world culinary attention earlier than other Southeast Asian cuisines, there is a widespread misconception abroad that satay originated from Thailand. As a result, it is most frequently associated with Thai food in the Western world. For example, in the United States, satay is said to be one of America's favourite Thai dishes.

The first satay restaurant in Thailand was in front of Chaloem Buri Theater near the Chaloem Buri Intersection in the Yaowarat neighborhood. Now it is on Rama IV Road near Lumphini MRT station and has been for more than 50 years.

Fusion satay

Traditionally, satay referred to any grilled skewered meats with various sauces; it is not necessarily served solely with peanut sauce. However, since the most popular variant of satay is chicken satay in peanut sauce (Sate Madura in Indonesia), in modern fusion cuisine the term "satay" has shifted to satay style peanut sauce instead.

For example, the fusion "satay burger" refers to beef hamburger served with so-called "satay sauce", which is mainly a kind of sweet and spicy peanut sauce or often replaced with gloppy peanut butter. The Singapore satay bee hoon is actually rice vermicelli served in peanut sauce. The American-Thai fusion fish fillet in satay sauce also demonstrates the same trend. The fusion French cuisine Cuisses de Grenouilles Poelees au Satay, Chou-fleur Croquant is actually frog legs in peanut sauce. The Indomie instant noodle is also available in satay flavour, which is only the addition of peanut sauce in its packet. In Hong Kong, satay sauce is usually served with instant noodles and stir-fried beef. This dish is most often eaten for breakfast.

Satay in culture 

Being for a very long time one of the most popular dishes of the national cuisines of Indonesia, satay has taken a fairly prominent place in the culture of these countries. In both Indonesian, the verb menyate (to cook satay) arose, based on the corresponding root stem. In addition to its direct meaning, it also has a figurative meaning — to bring discord, to separate, and the corresponding noun persatean means discord, split, troubles, which is associated with one of the main stages in the preparation of this dish — cutting the product into pieces.

The term persatean is often contrasted with similar sounding term persatuan (unity), to contradict their meanings. The contrasting word play sentence: "Persatuan bukan persatean" was famously emphasised by Mohammad Hatta that uses satay as a metaphor. During his speech, Hatta denotes that persatean — the "unity" among meat pieces in satay — is "forced" upon them by stabbing them with skewer, thus eloquently argue that this type of "satay unity" is not desired, since it is forced upon, not genuine and without the willingness of those who participates.

Satay belongs to the informal ethnocultural symbols of Indonesia. The image of this food appears on Indonesian postage stamps, in tourist brochures, information and advertising materials dedicated to this country, and is often played up by Indonesian participants in various cultural and entertainment events held abroad to create a national flavor. For example, the Indonesian model Aurra Kharisma performed in 2021 at the Miss Grand International beauty pageant in a suit with satay images and a headdress decorated with several bundles of satay meat skewers.

In some parts of Indonesia, certain types of satay are attributed with different symbolic meanings. Especially Bali stands out: the popular on this island satay lilit — minced sausages stuck on lemongrass stalks — is considered there a symbol of several virtues and benefits at once: male prowess, unity and prosperity. The Balinese attribute the embodiment of the weapons of various Hindu deities and mythological heroes to other local types of satay.

In Bandung, the West Java Governor's office is popularly called Gedung Sate to refer the satay-like pinnacle on its roof.

See also

References

External links

 Recording of an Indonesian sate seller in Jakarta
 Indonesian chicken satay recipe
 Indonesian pork satay recipe
 Surabaya coconut beef satay recipe
 Balinese chicken satay recipe
 Malaysian chicken satay recipe
 Singapore chicken satay recipe
 Zamboanga: Satti in the city and more
 Travel Gastronomy: Satti Ala Zambo
 Thai chicken satay recipe

 
Malaysian cuisine
Singaporean cuisine
Philippine cuisine
Thai cuisine
Javanese cuisine
Malay cuisine
Bruneian cuisine
Padang cuisine
Dutch fusion cuisine
Indonesian snack foods
French fusion cuisine
Sri Lankan snack food
National dishes
Street food in Indonesia
Street food in Thailand
Street food